The Diawling National Park lies in south west Mauritania around the Senegal River delta.  During the rainy season, much of the park consists of large lakes.  It is known for having over 220 species of identified birds, including pelicans, black storks, and flamingos, and also for its fish.

Geography and establishment
Diawling National Park was established in 1991. The park sprawls over an area of 16,000 hectares, all of which was once a floodplain. The Senegal River acts like a boundary between the park and the Djoudj National Bird Sanctuary, which was established in 1971. The Djoudj National Bird Sanctuary is located in the Republic of Senegal. The opposition to the establishment of the Diawling National Park came mostly from the local inhabitants, who feared a similar fate as that of the populace of Djoudj. They were fearful of the consequences of a protected area, which would mean that grazing and fishing would be prohibited or limited, ending a way of life that their tribes had always known.

Diawling is part of a Trans-Border Biosphere Reserve that is a popular bird nesting site because of the combination of fresh and salt water at the Senegal River delta.  The park also has a significant population of primates, wart hogs and wild donkeys.

Some of the region's worst malaria is found in this area, due to the construction some years ago of a dam built in the area.  Bilharzia and invasive plant species have also taken hold.

Diawling National Park is home to a remarkable variety of birds. The species found here include northern pintail (Anas acuta), northern shoveler (Anas clypeata), greater flamingo (Phoenicopterus roseus), lesser flamingo (Phoeniconaias minor), Eurasian spoonbill (Platalea leucorodia), African spoonbill (Platalea alba), great egret (Casmerodius albus), great white pelican (Pelecanus onocrotalus), Arabian bustard (Ardeotis arabs), pied avocet (Recurvirostra avosetta), slender-billed gull (Larus genei), Caspian tern (Sterna caspia), greater hoopoe-lark (Alaemon alaudipes) and Sudan golden sparrow (Passer luteus).

Mammals
Nature and man combined to obliterate some species in Diawling. Some of the larger mammals perished due to prolonged drought and excessive hunting. The last remaining West African lion (Panthera leo leo) in Diawling was shot in 1970, and the last sighting of the red-fronted gazelle was in 1991. Today, the only mammals in the park are Spotted hyenas, African golden wolves, warthogs, African wildcats, Cape hares and patas monkeys. Other species like the manatee, crocodile, and hippopotamus disappeared with the construction of the dam.

Climate change

In 2022, the IPCC Sixth Assessment Report included Diawling National Park in the list of African natural heritage sites which would be threatened by flooding and coastal erosion by the end of the century, but only if climate change followed RCP 8.5, which is the scenario of high and continually increasing greenhouse gas emissions associated with the warming of over 4°C., and is no longer considered very likely. The other, more plausible scenarios result in lower warming levels and consequently lower sea level rise: yet, sea levels would continue to increase for about 10,000 years under all of them. Even if the warming is limited to 1.5°C, global sea level rise is still expected to exceed  after 2000 years (and higher warming levels will see larger increases by then), consequently exceeding 2100 levels of sea level rise under RCP 8.5 (~ with a range of ) well before the year 4000.

See also
 Wildlife of Mauritania

References

National parks of Mauritania
Ramsar sites in Mauritania